NHS Health Scotland was the Scottish national health education and promotion agency. A Special Health Board of NHS Scotland, its goal was to improve the health of the nation, via research, planning, programme implementation and evaluation.

NHS Health Scotland provided leadership and helped coordinate the work of other bodies, principally the 14 regional NHS Boards, in improving the health of the population and reducing health inequality.

NHS Health Scotland was established on 1 April 2003, by the merger of the Health Education Board for Scotland (HEBS) and the Public Health Institute of Scotland (PHIS). It was dissolved by the establishment of Public Health Scotland on 1 April 2020. It employed about 280 staff.

The work of the agency was focussed on:
 child oral health
 child healthy weight
 alcohol brief interventions
 suicide prevention
 smoking cessation
 cardiovascular health

NHS Health Scotland was dissolved and succeeded by Public Health Scotland on 1 April 2020. This new national Special Health Board is a collaborative approach by both the Scottish Government and COSLA to give effect to the recommendations of the 2015 Review of Public Health.

See also
 Demography of Scotland

References

External links
 Official website

2003 establishments in Scotland
Alcohol in Scotland
Demographics of Scotland
Government agencies established in 2003
Health education in the United Kingdom
Health care quality
Medical research institutes in the United Kingdom
NHS Scotland
Organisations based in Edinburgh
Public health in the United Kingdom
Research institutes in Scotland
Researchers in alcohol abuse
Health education organizations